Steam Link is a hardware and software solution made by Valve Corporation for streaming Steam content from a personal computer or Steam Machine wirelessly to a mobile device or other monitor. Steam Link was originally released as a hardware device alongside the debut of Steam Machines in November 2015. Valve discontinued the Steam Link hardware device in November 2018, in favor of supporting its software-based Steam Link application for mobile devices and smart televisions, as well as providing Steam Link as a software package for the Raspberry Pi microcomputer.

Functionality 
Steam Link, whether in hardware or software form, supports the streaming of content from a personal computer running Steam to the video device (a connected television or monitor for the hardware unit, the mobile device's screen for the software version). In this setup, the device acting as the Steam Link (the hardware unit or the mobile device in software form) enables a game controller connected to it to be used to control the  game over the connection to the home computer.

Prior to March 2019, both the personal computer and the Steam Link hardware device or mobile device using Steam Link software had to be on the same internal network. With an update in March 2019, Valve introduced the Steam Link Anywhere update that allows one to stream across the internet, though the performance of the streaming will be strongly affected by the bandwidth and latency between the personal computer and device with Steam Link.

Hardware 
Steam Link is a stand-alone hardware device to enable streaming of Steam content from a personal computer or a Steam Machine wirelessly to a television set, including integration of Steam Controller gamepad. The device was released along with the debut of Steam Machines in November 2015. Valve quietly discontinued the Steam Link in November 2018, in favor of supporting its software-based Steam Link application for mobile devices, smart televisions, and a software package for the Raspberry Pi.

Steam Link is listed as having the following technical specifications:

 Wired 100 Mbit/s Fast Ethernet and Wireless 802.11ac 2×2 (MIMO)
 3× USB 2.0 ports
 Bluetooth 4.0 
 HDMI out
 Support for the following control peripherals: Steam Controller, DualShock 4, Xbox One or 360 Wired Controller, Xbox 360 Wireless Controller for Windows, Logitech Wireless Gamepad F710, or keyboard and mouse

A tear-down revealed the following specific hardware parts:

 Marvell DE3005-A1 CPU
 Marvell WiFi chip 88W8897
 Vivante GC1000 GPU

The Steam Link comes with power adapters for various countries.

Software

Operating system 
The Steam Link uses a modified version of Linux based on version 3.8 of the Linux kernel. It is possible to enable root SSH access to the system.

SDK  
One month after release, support was added to the Steam Link to have Steam Link apps, which can be created using an SDK. A number of such apps have been created, such as apps for accessing Kodi, but no database or store for them exists as of November 2017.

Games and applications 
Any Steam game that can run on the host computer can be streamed to the Steam Link. On Linux host it is also possible to stream a Windows game using the Proton beta (released August 2018). Non-Steam games can be played as well.

Discontinuation 
Valve announced in November 2018 that they are no longer manufacturing the Steam Link hardware device, and will sell off the remaining stock. Valve will continue to support software and device updates to existing Steam Link hardware, but are directing users towards the mobile app to provide the same functionality.

Software 

In May 2018, Valve announced it would release the Steam Link application for iOS, Android, tvOS, and Android TV devices that will allow users to play streaming games to these devices, without the need for the Link hardware. However, Apple rejected the application from its App Store because of "business conflicts with app guidelines". The app was eventually released on iOS in May 2019. In 2018, Steam Link also released on Samsung smart TVs. In March 2021, Valve released the app for Linux and macOS.

Raspberry Pi 
Valve provides a free application for single board computers Raspberry Pi 3, 3 B+, and Raspberry Pi 4 running Raspbian Stretch that provides the same functionality as the original Steam Link hardware. Valve published a beta version of the Steam Link package for Raspberry Pi on December 3, 2018. The official version was released on December 13, 2018.

References

External links 
 

Products introduced in 2015
Link
Cloud gaming